Johan Engelbert Elias (18 August 1875 – 1 August 1959) was a Dutch historian known mostly for his important work on the history of Amsterdam's regency ("Vroedschap van Amsterdam").

Biography
He was born on a canal house on the Keizersgracht to Gerbrand Pieter Elias, wealthy member of the Amsterdam regency family Elias, and Johanna Engelberta ter Meulen. From 1892 to 1905 he worked as volunteer documentalist for the Amsterdam archives. During this time he collected data on Amsterdam regency members from the start of the Dutch republic in 1578 until the French occupation in 1795. He was able to collect data on 14,000 people, which he published in 1903 and 1905 as a two-volume work called De vroedschap van Amsterdam 1578-1795. He is considered the father of genealogical research in the Netherlands. The introduction to the first volume was published separately as Geschiedenis van het Amsterdamsche Regentenpatriciaat in 1923. It shows the various relationships among Amsterdam regent families and their archives. In 1922 he was awarded an honorary title from the University of Amsterdam, and in 1927 he became a member of the Royal Netherlands Academy of Arts and Sciences (KNAW).

Works
De vroedschap van Amsterdam 1578-1795, 1903-1905
Schetsen uit de geschiedenis van het zeewezen, 6 volumes, 1916-1930
Het voorspel van den eersten Engelschen oorlog, 2 volumes, 1920
Geschiedenis van het Amsterdamsche Regentenpatriciaat, 1923
De tweede Engelsche oorlog als het keerpunt in onze betrekkingen met Engeland, 1930
De vlootbouw in Nederland in de eerste helft der 17e eeuw, 1596-1655, 1933
De geschiedenis van een Amsterdamsche regentenfamilie. Het geslacht Elias, 1937
 Het Geslacht Elias : de geschiedenis van Een Amsterdamsche Regentenfamilie, 1937, 289 pp.  (Delpher.nl)
Genealogie van het geslacht Elias, Faas Elias en Witsen Elias, Assen, 1942

References

External links
P.C.A. Geyl, 'Levensbericht', in: Jaarboek KNAW, 1960
J.R. Bruijn, 'Elias, Johan Engelbert (1875-1959)', in: Biografisch Woordenboek van Nederland 2 (1985)

20th-century Dutch historians
1875 births
1959 deaths
Members of the Royal Netherlands Academy of Arts and Sciences
Writers from Amsterdam